White Flint may refer to:
North Bethesda station, a Washington Metro station in Montgomery County, Maryland, formerly named White Flint station
White Flint Mall, a former shopping mall in Montgomery County, Maryland
An urbanized neighborhood in North Bethesda surrounding the Washington Metro station formerly named White Flint